Lede may refer to:

 Lead paragraph (US English), the first paragraph of a composition

Places
 Lede, Belgium, a municipality in Flanders
 Lède, a river in France
 Lede Formation, a geologic formation in Belgium

People
 Marquess of Lede of Flanders
 Kiana Ledé (born 1997) US musician and actress

Other uses
 LEDE, a Linux distribution of embedded Linux

See also
 Lead (disambiguation)